Marvin L. Sands (1924 –  August 28, 1999) was an American businessman, and the founder and CEO of Constellation Brands, a Fortune 500 beer, wine and spirits company.

Early life
Marvin Sands was the son of Mordecai E. Sands, who was a partner in a winery in Long Island City, Queens, New York since 1932. He was of Jewish descent.

Sands earned a bachelor's degree from the University of North Carolina at Chapel Hill, and served as an ensign in the US Navy during World War II.

Career
Sands founded the Canandaigua Wine Company in 1945 at age 21.

Sands tried to establish a brand, and was unsuccessful with King Solomon kosher wine and an eponymous Sands brand. In 1954 he produced a "flaming-red blend of dessert wine" called Richard's Wild Irish Rose, named after his son Richard, and this grew to become more than 90% of their sales in the 1960s.

By 1980, annual sales topped $50 million. The company was renamed Constellation Brands in 2000. In 1987, he acquired the Manischewitz Wine Company and in 1988, received kosher certification for the brand from the Union of Orthodox Jewish Congregations of America. It has acquired several companies including Robert Mondavi wine and Svedka vodka.

Sands served as the company's CEO from its inception until 1993, when he was succeeded by his son Richard Sands.

Personal life
Sands lived in Canandaigua, New York with his wife Marilyn "Mickey" Sands. He had two sons, Richard Sands and Robert Sands; and a daughter Laurie Sands Stern (died 1995). He died on August 28, 1999; services were held at Temple B'rith Kodesh in Rochester, New York.

The Constellation Brands – Marvin Sands Performing Arts Center is named in his honor.

References

1924 births
People from Canandaigua, New York
1999 deaths
American company founders
University of North Carolina at Chapel Hill alumni
American chief executives of food industry companies
American people of Jewish descent
United States Navy personnel of World War II